Mecklenburgische Seenplatte is a district in the southeast of Mecklenburg-Vorpommern, Germany. It is bounded by (from the west and clockwise) the districts Ludwigslust-Parchim, Rostock (district), Vorpommern-Rügen, Vorpommern-Greifswald, and the state Brandenburg to the south. The district covers the largest area of all German districts and more than doubles the area of the state Saarland. The district seat is the town Neubrandenburg.

History 
Mecklenburgische Seenplatte District was established by merging the former districts of Müritz, Mecklenburg-Strelitz and most of Demmin (except the Ämter Jarmen-Tutow and Peenetal/Loitz), along with the former district-free town of Neubrandenburg as part of the local government reform of September 2011. The name of the district was decided by referendum on 4 September 2011.

In 2012, a new coat of arms was proposed for Mecklenburgische Seenplatte District. It was rejected because one element used in the right part, which involved an eagle catching a fish, resembled a symbol used by the far-right neopagan group Artgemeinschaft.

Geographic features
There are a number of lakes within the boundaries of Mecklenburgische Seenplatte district, including:
 Lake Kummerow
 Kölpinsee
 Fleesensee
 Nietingsee

Towns and municipalities

References